Rob Kwiet (born August 2, 1988) is a Canadian professional ice hockey player who is currently with the Greenville Swamp Rabbits of the ECHL. He has previously played in the American Hockey League with the Providence Bruins and the Bridgeport Sound Tigers.

Playing career
Undrafted, Kwiet played major junior hockey in the Ontario Hockey League with the Mississauga St. Michael's Majors and the Windsor Spitfires.

On July 13, 2009, Kwiet signed a one-year contract with the Boston Bruins of the National Hockey League (NHL). On February 22, 2011, Kwiet signed a professional try out contract with the Bridgeport Sound Tigers of the American Hockey League (AHL).

On August 9, 2012, Kwiet was re-signed to a one-year contract with the Stockton Thunder. During the 2012–13 season, he was moved to the Greenville Road Warriors after one game before settling with the San Francisco Bulls on November 19, 2012.

On July 30, 2013, Kwiet signed a one-year contract as a free agent with his fifth ECHL club, the Fort Wayne Komets. In the 2013–14 season, on December 12, 2013, he was traded by the Komets to the Gwinnett Gladiators in exchange for Mike Embach. Kwiet then contributed with 23 points in 33 games before he was again traded to the Florida Everblades to finish the season.

Kweit signed abroad on July 19, 2014, as a free agent in agreeing to a one-year contract with second division German club, ESV Kaufbeuren of the DEL2.

After a season in Germany, Kwiet returned to North America agreeing to a second stint with the Greenville Road Warriors (later renamed the Swamp Rabbits) of the ECHL on August 14, 2015.

In 2018, Kwiet competed in the National Ball Hockey Championships Division B with Windsor's Rosati Construction team.

Career statistics

References

External links

1988 births
Living people
Bridgeport Sound Tigers players
Canadian ice hockey defencemen
Florida Everblades players
Fort Wayne Komets players
Greenville Road Warriors players
Greenville Swamp Rabbits players
Gwinnett Gladiators players
ESV Kaufbeuren players
Mississauga St. Michael's Majors players
Muskegon Fury players
Providence Bruins players
Reading Royals players
San Francisco Bulls players
Ice hockey people from Toronto
Stockton Thunder players
Toronto St. Michael's Majors players
Windsor Spitfires players
Canadian expatriate ice hockey players in Germany